Neetho is a 2002 Telugu romance film directed by John Mahendran, starring Prakash Kovelamudi and Mahek Chahal in their debut roles. The film marked the debut of K. Raghavendra Rao's son Prakash Kovelamudi (Suryaprakash). Despite the film's failure, John Mahendran loosely adapted the film in Tamil as Sachein.

Synopsis
Madhav is a new student of a college in Hyderabad. He spots a beautiful girl Shalini and falls in love with her. Madhav is calm but Shalini is short-tempered. She gets into a fight with an eve teaser whose father happens to be a notorious faction leader. When Madhav confronts the leader, it is revealed that Madhav is the son of Manohar, a successful industrialist.

A flashback episode begins and it is revealed that Manohar wants Madhav to select a bride for himself. Madhav feels that girls want to marry him only because he is the son of a billionaire. He asks his father to give him a year's time so that he will join a college in Hyderabad as a normal student and select a girl who loves him truly. When Shalini rejects Madhav's proposal, he asks her to act as his lover for thirty days and he says that she would automatically fall in love. Shalini accepts the offer and starts acting as his lover for thirty days. After thirty days, Shalini tells Madhav that she is not in love with him. Deep inside, she begins to like him, but she suppresses her feelings due to her preconceived notion of not falling in love. After much rethinking, she decides to express her love. Her plans are spoilt when she learns that Madhav is the son of a billionaire. She thinks that Madhav might misunderstand her and feel she changed her mind after realizing that he is the son of a wealthy tycoon. What eventually happens between the two forms the climax of the movie.

Cast
 Suryaprakash as Madhav 
 Mahek Chahal as Shalini
 Prakash Raj as Manohar
 Brahmanandam as Madhav's housekeeper
 Rajiv Kanakala
 Sunil as Sunil
 Tanikella Bharani as Shalini's father
 Delhi Rajeshwari as Shalini's mother
 Raghu Karumanchi as Madhav's friend
 Chitram Seenu as Madhav's friend
 Dharmavarapu Subramanyam
 Ahuti Prasad

Soundtrack 
The soundtrack is composed by Vidyasagar. Lyrics of all the songs were penned by Chandrabose. The song "Navvali Neetho" is based on "Thathamma Peru" from Dhosth.

Reception
The film received negative reviews and was a box-office failure. Jeevi of Idlebrain gave the film a rating of two-and-three-quarters out of five and opined that "First half of the film is promising. But the second half takes a severe beating with dragged scenes and snail-paced narration". Gudipoodi Srihari of The Hindu gave the film a negative review. It was later remade into Tamil as Sachien.

References

2000s Telugu-language films
2002 films
Films scored by Vidyasagar
Indian romance films
2000s romance films
Telugu films remade in other languages
Films directed by John Mahendran